William Sidebottom may refer to:

 William Sidebottom (English politician) (1841–1933), English Conservative politician
 William Sidebottom (RAF officer) (1893–1920), British World War I flying ace
 William Sidebottom (cricketer) (1862–1948), Australian cricketer
 William Sidebottom (Australian politician) (1836–1932), member of the Tasmanian House of Assembly